Union Township is one of twenty-six townships in Fulton County, Illinois, USA.  As of the 2010 census, its population was 1,008 and it contained 471 housing units.

Geography

Cities, towns, villages
 Avon

Extinct towns
 Pleasant Ridge
 Troy
(These are listed as "historical" by the USGS.)

Cemeteries
The township contains these four cemeteries: Avon, Babbitt, Flake and Saint Augustine.

Major highways
  Illinois Route 41

Lakes
 Avondale Lake

Demographics

School districts
 Avon Community Unit School District 176
 Spoon River Valley Community Unit School District 4

Political districts
 Illinois' 17th congressional district
 State House District 94
 State Senate District 47

References
 
 United States Census Bureau 2007 TIGER/Line Shapefiles
 United States National Atlas

External links
 City-Data.com
 Illinois State Archives

Townships in Fulton County, Illinois
Townships in Illinois